Tritium Calcio 1908 is an Italian association football club located in Trezzo sull'Adda, Lombardy, currently playing in Serie D.

The noun Tritium comes from the Latin name of the city in which it took the life activities of the club.

History
The club was born in 1908 as Società Ginnastica Tritium with sections for all kinds of sports. The main activities were cyclistic journeys and football was played locally.
Soon after the end of World War I their home ground was enlarged to allow meeting the Italian F.I.G.C. standards but up to 1927 main matches were against local amateurs.
In 1925 the club changed name to Società Sportiva and later to Fascio Giovanile di Combattimento and Associazione Sportiva Trezzo, due to the fascist influence up to 1945.

The football team always took part to regional amateur championships excepting two times when it was promoted to national amateur league (Serie D) in 1976 and 2005.

In the season 2010–11 from Lega Pro Seconda Divisione it was promoted to Lega Pro Prima Divisione with the head coach Stefano Vecchi.

In summer 2010 after the promotion to Lega Pro Seconda Divisione it changed its name to Tritium Calcio 1908. In the next season it was promoted to Lega Pro Prima Divisione.

At the end of the 2012–13 Lega Pro Prima Divisione season the club despite the conquest of salvation after play-off, didn't enroll in the 2013–14 Lega Pro Prima Divisione league, restarting from Promozione.
At the end of the 2013–14 Promozione season the club did not enroll in the 2014–15 Promozione league and dead.

From 2014 to 2016 Tritium was only active as a youth team. The club resumed its activity in 2016, starting from Prima Categoria and winning three consecutive promotions to reach Serie D already in 2019.

Colors and badge
Its colors are white and blue.

Chronology

References

External links
Official Site 

Football clubs in Italy
Association football clubs established in 1908
Football clubs in Lombardy
Serie C clubs
1908 establishments in Italy